Balkrishna Industries Limited (BKT) is an Indian multinational tyre manufacturing company based in Mumbai, India. Balkrishna Industries manufactures off-highway tyres used in specialist segments like mining, earthmoving, agriculture, and gardening in five factories located in Aurangabad, Bhiwadi, Chopanki, Dombivali, and Bhuj. In 2013, it was ranked 41st among the world’s tyre makers.

History
Balkrishna Industries began operations in the year 1987 with the inauguration of its first off-highway tyre manufacturing facility in Aurangabad. Subsequent growth in business allowed the company to open new facilities in Bhiwadi (2002) and Chopanaki (2006). It also diversified its product line by introducing tyres for ATV, earthmoving and gardening vehicles.

Operations

Balkrishna Industries is currently an OEM vendor for heavy equipment manufacturers like JCB, John Deere, and CNH Industrial. In 2014, BKT held a 8% market share of the global off-the-road tyre segment.

Balkrishna Industries predominantly caters to the replacement market in North America and Europe. Its North American office is located in Akron, Ohio, with one warehouse in Wando, South Carolina. About 80 percent of Balkrishna Industries' business in the United States is in the farm market.

Sponsorships

BKT Tires has been the official and exclusive tyre sponsor for Monster Jam since 2014. 

In July 2018, BKT purchased naming rights for Italian football's second division, Serie B for three years, with the league being known as Serie BKT under the agreement. 

On 15 January 2020, BKT signed an agreement with LFP to rename the French football second division as Ligue 2 BKT for four years.

On 2 September 2022, BKT were announced as northern hemisphere title sponsorship for the United Rugby Championship for three years.

References

Tyre manufacturers of India
Manufacturing companies based in Mumbai
Indian companies established in 1987
Automotive companies of India
Indian brands
1987 establishments in Maharashtra
Manufacturing companies established in 1987
Companies listed on the National Stock Exchange of India
Companies listed on the Bombay Stock Exchange